Isenburg-Meerholz (or Ysenburg-Büdingen-Meerholz) was a County of southern Hesse, Germany. It was created as a partition of Isenburg-Büdingen (or Ysenburg-Büdingen) in 1687 (Third Main-Partition), and was mediatised to Isenburg in 1806. In 2007, with the addition of Romania and Bulgaria, Meerholz (now a part of the former free town of Gelnhausen) became the European Union's new geographical center.

Counts of Isenburg-Meerholz (1687-1806)

Counties of the Holy Roman Empire
House of Isenburg
States and territories established in 1673
1673 establishments in the Holy Roman Empire